Lambada is a 1990 drama film starring J. Eddie Peck, Melora Hardin, Adolfo "Shabba-doo" Quiñones, Ricky Paull Goldin, Dennis Burkley, and Keene Curtis. Lambada was written and directed by Joel Silberg and choreographed by Shabba-Doo.

The film was released simultaneously with rival film The Forbidden Dance; neither was well received, though Lambada was seen as 'the better of the two'.

Plot
A Beverly Hills school teacher by day, Kevin Laird (J. Eddie Peck) journeys at night to a warehouse in East Los Angeles, California, where a group of barrio kids gather to dance the lambada.

Using his dazzling dance moves to earn the kids' respect and acceptance, Kevin then teaches them academics in an informal backroom study hall. One of his students, Sandy (Melora Hardin) sees him at the club. The next morning at school while Kevin is teaching, Sandy daydreams that she and Kevin are dancing and he madly kisses her on his motorcycle. It's the best of both worlds, but when Sandy becomes a jealous and lovestruck student and she exposes Kevin's double life, his two worlds collide, threatening his job and reputation.

Cast
 J. Eddie Peck - Kevin Laird/Blade/Carlos Gutierrez
 Melora Hardin - Sandy Thomas
 Adolfo "Shabba-doo" Quinones - Ramone
 Leticia Vasquez - Pink Toes
 Dennis Burkley - Uncle Big
 Rita Bland - Lesley
 Jimmy Locust - Ricochet
 Kayla Blake - Bookworm (as Elsie Sniffen)
 Richard Giorla - Double J
 Debra Hopkins - Muriel (as Debra Spagnoli)
 Eddie Garcia - Chili
 Kristina Starman - Linda Laird
 Keene Curtis - Principal Singleton
 Basil Hoffman - Supt. Leland
 Ricky Paull Goldin - Dean
 Eric Taslitz - Egghead
 Thalmus Rasulala - Wesley Wilson
 Gina Ravera - Funk Queen

Release and reception
Lambada opened on March 16, 1990 at #8, and earned $2,031,181 to 1117 theaters. It quickly fell from the box office with a scant $4,263,112, after receiving mixed reviews. It holds a 47% on Rotten Tomatoes. Kevin Thomas, in his review (of this film and The Forbidden Dance) for the Los Angeles Times, noted that both of them 'revive the spirit of Sam Katzman, who turned out similar quickies in the ‘50s to cash in on rock ‘n’ roll and the Twist'; he singled out Lambada as the 'slicker but more impersonally directed' of the two. The two films also shared a review from Jon Pareles of The New York Times, who described Lambada as the 'glossier [and more] music-video-ready' of the two. Owen Gleiberman paired the two films again in his review for Entertainment Weekly, where he described them as having 'all the allure of a frozen burrito'. In yet another paired review of both films for The Washington Post, Rita Kempley dismissed them as 'pandering and exploitative'; she described Lambada as being 'far lighter on its feet with a flashier look and a professional cast'.

On their syndicated television program, where Lambada was reviewed separately, Gene Siskel and Roger Ebert had an intense disagreement regarding the film. While noting Silberg's limitations as a director, Siskel praised the performances of the lead performers, and described it as 'an instant guilty pleasure [...] a film I'm almost embarrassed to admit held my attention [...] because I'm prepared to defend it now against Roger's sure attacks'. Ebert, who remarked that Siskel 'should be embarrassed' by his opinion of the film, viewed its dance sequences as 'badly lit, badly photographed, badly choreographed' and attacked the camera angles and story-line; he noted that he was 'stunned that anyone would make this picture'.

Home video
Lambada was released on DVD on Apr 15, 2003.

Soundtrack
 "Set The Night On Fire" - Sweet Obsession
 "This Moment In Time" - Absolute
 "Perfect" - Dina D!
 "Tease Me, Please Me" - Tony Terry
 "Lambada Dancing" - Kathy Sledge
 "Gotta Lambada" - Absolute
 "I Like The Rhythm" (Sandy's Fantasy Theme) - Carrie Lucas
 "Rock Lambada" - Johnny Thomas Jr.
 "Wes Groove" - Billy Wolfer
 "Sata" - Brenda K. Starr
 "Give It Up" - Judette Warren
 "In The Heat Of The Night" - Soul II Soul

References

External links
  
 
 
 

1990 films
1990 drama films
1990s dance films
Films about educators
American dance films
Golan-Globus films
Warner Bros. films
Films produced by Yoram Globus
Films set in Los Angeles
1990s English-language films
Films directed by Joel Silberg
1990s American films